George Harry Grey, 5th Earl of Stamford (1 October 1737 – 28 May 1819), styled Lord Grey from 1739 to 1768, was a British nobleman, who additionally became a peer of Great Britain as Earl of Warrington in 1796.

The eldest son and heir of Harry Grey, 4th Earl of Stamford by his wife Lady Mary, only daughter and heiress of George Booth, 2nd Earl of Warrington, baptised on 21 October at Newtown Linford, Leicestershire.  Educated at Leicester School he went up to Queens' College, Cambridge. where he matriculated in the Michaelmas term 1755, graduating MA in 1758.

Lord Grey served as Whig MP for Staffordshire from 1761 until 1768.  On 22 September he was a Page of Honour at George III's coronation. Colonel of the Royal Chester Regiment of Militia from 1764, and Lord Lieutenant from 1783.  

The Grey family owned large tracts of land at Enville in Staffordshire and Bradgate Park in Leicestershire, and his mother had inherited Dunham Massey Hall and land in Stalybridge. His father died in 1768 and his mother in 1772.  He was created on 22 April 1796 the Baron Delamer of Dunham Massey, in the County of Chester, and Earl of Warrington.

On 28 May 1763, he married Lady Henrietta, second daughter of William Bentinck, 2nd Duke of Portland and the art collector Margaret Bentinck, Duchess of Portland, only daughter and heiress of Robert, 2nd Earl of Oxford and Mortimer at Stamford House, Whitehall, and registry office, Westminster, having nine children including:

 Lady Henrietta (1764-1826), married John Chetwode
 George Grey, 6th Earl of Stamford (1765-1845), his successor in the family titles
 Lady Marie Booth Grey (1767-1767)
 Lady Maria (1769-1838), married John Cotes MP
 Lady Louisa Booth Grey (1771-1830)
 William Booth Grey (1773-1852)
 Anchitel Grey, a prebendary (1774-1833)
 Henry Grey, a naval commander (1776-1799)
 Lady Sophia (1777-1849), married her cousin, Booth Grey, of Ashton Hayes
 Lady Amelia (1779-1849), married John Lister Kaye

He succeeded to his father's earldom in 1768. His brother-in-law, William Cavendish-Bentinck, 3rd Duke of Portland, while Prime Minister, suggested that Stamford should also become a peer of Great Britain in addition to being an English peer. He accepted an earldom in 1796 from Portland's successor William Pitt the Younger, rather than the reported previous offer of a marquessate; in the absence of there being another dukedom in keeping with Grey family tradition (cf Henry Grey, 1st Duke of Suffolk), Stamford deemed it better to preserve the memory of his grandmaternal family whose estates he had inherited. Thus he received the additional titles of Baron Delamer and Earl of Warrington (in the peerage of Great Britain) in recognition of the Booth family.

He modernised the family's Staffordshire seat at Enville to the design of Thomas Hope. He promoted the development of the town of Ashton-under-Lyne (where he had appointed his cousin, George Booth as Rector) near Manchester, on land inherited from the Earls of Warrington.

On his death at Enville Hall on 23 May 1819 he was succeeded by his eldest son, after his will was proven became 6th Earl of Stamford and 2nd Earl of Warrington.

See also
 Dunham Massey

References

External links 
Burkes Peerage (1939 edition).
 Burke's Peerage and Baronetage (106th edition, 1999)
 The Complete Peerage of Great Britain and Ireland, St Catherine's Press, 1949

 

1737 births
1819 deaths
18th-century English nobility
19th-century English nobility
Alumni of Queens' College, Cambridge
Grey, George Grey, Lord
Grey, George Grey, Lord
Lord-Lieutenants of Cheshire
George
Earls of Stamford
Earls of Warrington
Barons Grey of Groby